King's Ransom: An 87th Precinct Mystery is a novel  by Ed McBain (Evan Hunter) published in 1959, part of his 87th Precinct series of police procedural novels and short stories.

Adaptations
 The 1963 Japanese film High and Low, directed by Akira Kurosawa, is loosely based on the novel.
 "King's Ransom", episode 21 of the American television series 87th Precinct, is based on the novel. It was broadcast February 19, 1962.

See also
 Evan Hunter bibliography

References 

American crime novels
American novels adapted into films
1959 American novels
Novels by Evan Hunter